Count Jean-Henry-Louis Greffulhe (May 21, 1774 – February 23, 1820) was a French banker and politician. He was the founder of a bank called Greffulhe Montz et Cie. He served as a member of the Chamber of Peers from 1814 to 1820.

References

1774 births
1820 deaths
French bankers
French politicians
Businesspeople from Amsterdam